Ride a Rock Horse is the second solo studio album by English singer Roger Daltrey, released on 4 July 1975 by Track in the UK and MCA in the US. Ride a Rock Horse was recorded during Daltrey's filming commitments for Ken Russell's film Lisztomania. The album's cover, which is photographed and designed by Daltrey's cousin Graham Hughes, depicts the singer as a rampant centaur.

Three singles were issued from Ride a Rock Horse: "Come and Get Your Love", "Walking the Dog" and "Oceans Away". "Come and Get Your Love" peaked at No. 68 on the US Billboard Hot 100 and "Walking the Dog", a cover of the Rufus Thomas song, peaked at No. 52 on the UK Singles Chart. The album itself peaked at No. 14 on the UK Albums Chart and at No. 28 on the US Billboard 200. The song, "Hearts Right", had a music video with graphics and animation by Gerald Scarfe, who would later become known for his work with Pink Floyd.

Track listing

Non-album material 
"You Put Something Better Inside Me" (Gerry Rafferty, Joe Egan) (B-side of the 1977 single "One Of The Boys"; this version is an alternate outtake)
"Dear John" (David Courtney) (B-side of the 1977 single "Written On The Wind"; the liner notes to the reissue CD state that this was an outtake from the Ride a Rock Horse sessions)
"Oceans Away (alternate version)" (Goodhand-Tait)

Personnel 

 Roger Daltrey - vocals
 Russ Ballard - guitar, keyboards, backing vocals
 Clem Clempson - guitar solo on "Feeling"
 Dave Wintour - bass guitar
 Stuart Francis - drums
 John Barham - string and brass arrangements
 Paul Korda - piano, backing vocals
 Henry Spinetti - drums
 Tony Meehan - congas, strings, horns, reeds
 Alan Wicket - shakers on "Walking the Dog"
 Phil Kenzie - saxophone
 Nick Newall - alto saxophone
 Alan Brown - trumpet
 Kokomo, Paul Gorda, Sweedies - backing vocals
Technical
 John Jansen, Will Reid-Dick - engineer
 Graham Hughes - photography, art direction

Release history

See also
Roger Daltrey discography

References

External links
 

1975 albums
Roger Daltrey albums
Albums produced by Russ Ballard
Track Records albums